USS LST-1022 was an  built for the United States Navy during World War II.

The ship was laid down on 18 April 1944, at the Fore River Shipyard of the Bethlehem Shipbuilding Corporation in Quincy, Massachusetts, launched on 16 May 1944, and commissioned on 24 May 1944.

Service history
During World War II, LST-1022 was assigned to the Asiatic-Pacific theater and participated in the assault and occupation of Okinawa Gunto in June 1945. Following the war, LST-1022 performed occupation duty in the Far East until early August 1946.

Decommissioned on 31 December 1947 she was struck from the Naval Vessel Register on 22 January 1948, and sold for scrapping on 28 June 1948 to R. G. Greive.

Awards
LST-1022 earned one battle star for World War II service.

References
 
 

 

LST-542-class tank landing ships
World War II amphibious warfare vessels of the United States
Ships built in Quincy, Massachusetts
1944 ships